The Tenures Abolition Act 1660 (12 Car 2 c 24), sometimes known as the Statute of Tenures, was an Act of the Parliament of England which changed the nature of several types of feudal land tenure in England. The long title of the Act was An act for taking away the Court of Wards and liveries, and tenures in capite, and by knights-service, and purveyance, and for settling a revenue upon his Majesty in lieu thereof.

This Act was partly in force in Great Britain at the end of 2010, though only section 4:

Passed by the Convention Parliament in 1660, shortly after the English Restoration, the Act replaced various types of military and religious service that tenants owed to the Crown with socage, and compensated the monarch with an annual fixed payment of £100,000 to be raised by means of a new tax on alcohol. (Frankalmoin, copyhold, and certain aspects of grand serjeanty were excluded.) It completed a process that had begun in 1610 during the reign of James I with the proposal of the Great Contract.

The Statute made constitutional gestures to reduce feudalism and removed the monarch's right to demand participation of certain subjects in the Army. By abolishing feudal obligations of those holding those feudal tenures other than by socage, such as by a knight's fee, it standardized most feudal tenancies of the aristocracy and gentry. The Act converted more of their tenures into ones which demanded nil or negligible impositions to the Crown. While socage usually implied rent to be payable to the monarch, no rent was paid in the form of free and common socage as interpreted by the courts. Instead the Act introduced and appointed collection offices and courts to administer a new form of taxation, called excise. Excise duty imposed taxation on the general public to provide an income for the monarch, its ministers and civil servants, to replace these relatively common feudal tenures among the landed classes.

Section 3 of the Act repealed the Acts 32 Hen. 8  46, and 33 Hen 8 c 22, thereby abolishing the Court of Wards and Liveries, established in 1540, which had been responsible for revenue collection under the feudal tenure system. It was also the first Act (under its section 14) to impose an excise duty on tea, as well as on coffee, sherbet and chocolate; the duty was placed on the manufactured beverage, and not the raw tea or coffee, treating it in much the same way as beer or spirits.

The Act also let any father, by last will and testament, designate a guardian for his children. The rights of this guardian superseded those of the children's mother.



Notes

References

Citations

Bibliography

External links
The Tenures Abolition Act 1660, as amended, from Legislation.gov.uk.

1660 in law
1660 in England
Acts of the Parliament of England
Acts of the Parliament of England still in force
Feudalism in England